The Tamsui Itteki Memorial House is a memorial hall in Tamsui District, New Taipei, Taiwan.

History
The memorial hall was opened on 5 April 2011 and inaugurated by New Taipei Mayor Eric Chu.

Exhibitions
The memorial hall houses Minakami Tsutomo and Chen Shun-chen collections to promote exchanges between modern Japanese and Taiwanese literature.

Transportation
The building is accessible north west from Tamsui Station of Taipei Metro.
Take Bus-Red 26 to Zonlei temple.
Also can take park-traveling bus-836.

See also
 List of tourist attractions in Taiwan

References

2011 establishments in Taiwan
Monuments and memorials in Taiwan